Xenoturbella hollandorum is a marine, benthic worm-like species that belongs to the genus Xenoturbella. It was discovered in eastern Pacific Ocean by a group of Californian and Australian scientists. The species was described in 2016.

X. hollandorum shares morphological similarities with other species of the genus Xenoturbella, and is known for lacking respiratory, circulatory and an excretory system.

Description 
The etymology of the species name corresponds to a scientific patronym in honor of Linda and Nicholas Holland.

The body wall displays several furrows: on the circumference, on the side, and two deep, longitudinal, dorsal ones. The mouth is orientated ventrally, anterior to the ring furrow. The live specimen exhibits an inconspicuous epidermal ventral glandular network.

Phylogeny 
Comparison of mitochondrial DNA and protein sequences showed that the species X. hollandorum is the sister group to X. bocki. In turn, these two species share evolutionary affinities with X. japonica into a clade of 'shallow-water' taxa.

References 

Xenacoelomorpha
Animals described in 2016